James Gill may refer to:

James Gill (artist) (born 1934), American pop-artist
James Gill (columnist), columnist for The Advocate (Louisiana)
James Gill (Irish cricketer) (1911–2000), Irish cricketer
James Gill (New Zealand cricketer) (1928–2019), New Zealand cricketer
James Gill (musician), former bassist for American hardcore band Senses Fail
James E. Gill (1901–1980), scientist, teacher, explorer and mine developer
James Elgin Gill (born 1987), world's most premature baby
Jim Gill (1865–1923), American baseball player
Jimmy Gill (1894–1964), English footballer of the 1910s, and 1920s
James Gill (footballer, born 1903), English footballer of the 1930s